Gabriel "Gabi" Teichner (גבי טייכנר; born November 21, 1945) is an Israeli former basketball player.
 He played the center position. He played in the Israeli Basketball Premier League, and for the Israel national basketball team.

Biography
Teichner is 2.03 m  (6 ft 8 in) tall. He lived in Kibbutz Nir David, and lives in Kibbutz Degania Bet, in Israel.

He played 13 seasons in the Israeli Basketball Premier League, averaging 15.8 points per game, for Hapoel Gvat, Hapoel Nir David, and Hapoel Alpha. Teichner also played for the Israel national basketball team in the 1967 European Championship for Men, 1968 European Olympic Qualifying Tournament for Men, 1969 European Championship for Men, 1971 European Championship for Men, and 1972 Pre-Olympic Basketball Tournament.

At the 1969 Maccabiah Games, he played with Tal Brody on the gold-medal winning basketball team.

References 

Living people
1945 births
Israeli men's basketball players
Israeli Basketball Premier League players
People from Degania Bet
Basketball players at the 1970 Asian Games
Medalists at the 1970 Asian Games
Asian Games medalists in basketball
Asian Games silver medalists for Israel
Jewish men's basketball players
Basketball players at the 1969 Maccabiah Games
Maccabiah Games basketball players of Israel
Maccabiah Games gold medalists for the United States